José Luyindula (born 18 November 1986) is a Congolese table tennis player. He competed in the men's singles event at the 2004 Summer Olympics.

References

External links
 

1986 births
Living people
Democratic Republic of the Congo male table tennis players
Olympic table tennis players of the Democratic Republic of the Congo
Table tennis players at the 2004 Summer Olympics
Place of birth missing (living people)
21st-century Democratic Republic of the Congo people